Admiral Bror Per Harald Stefenson (4 September 1929 – 3 October 2018) was a Swedish Navy officer. Stefenson's senior commands include Chief of the Defence Staff and military commander of the Eastern Military District (Milo Ö) as well as Commandant General in Stockholm. He also served as Chief of His Majesty's Military Staff. , Stefenson remains the last appointed Swedish admiral (having been appointed in 1991).

Early life
Stefenson was born on 4 September 1929 in Stockholm, the son of naval captain Jens Stefenson and his wife Astrid (née Grönberg). He passed studentexamen at Norra Real in Stockholm in 1948.

Career

Military career
In 1951, Stefenson was commissioned as an officer with the rank of acting sub-lieutenant (fänrik) and was promoted two years later to sub-lieutenant (löjtnant) before attending the Royal Swedish Naval Academy from 1954 to 1959. Stefenson was the captain of the submarine  in 1962 and in 1963, and was also promoted to lieutenant in 1963. He attended the Swedish Armed Forces Staff College in 1964 and was promoted to lieutenant commander in 1967 and to commander in 1970. He was promoted to captain in 1976 and was commanding officer of the 1st Submarine Flotilla from 1976 to 1978.

He was promoted to rear admiral in 1978 was chief of staff of the Southern Military District (Milo S) from 1978 to 1979 and commanding officer of the Coastal Fleet from 1980 to 1982 when he was promoted to vice admiral and appointed Chief of the Defence Staff in 1982. He was at the same time the head of the Joint Operations (Operationsledningen, OPL) in the Defence Staff. Also in 1982, Stefenson was elected board member, by the Swedish government, of the East Economic Office (Öst Ekonomiska Byrån), an agency which occupied a special position among the agencies engaged in the Swedish military intelligence.

Stefenson took office as Chief of the Defence Staff on 1 October 1982, the same day the so-called Hårsfjärden incident occurred when a foreign submarine was trapped by the Swedish Navy and a reported 44 depth charges and 4 naval mines where detonated, trying to sink the submarine, but it was later determined that it avoided the trap or fled at an early stage. Stefenson would later write Från periskop och brygga ("From periscope and bridge") with diary notes and memories from the submarine hunt 1–10 October 1982. Stefenson has been criticized for hiding the truth behind the incident.

He left the posts in the Defense Staff in 1987 and became head of the Swedish National Defence College. A year later he was appointed military commander of the Eastern Military District (Milo Ö) and at the same time to the post of Commandant General in Stockholm. Stefenson retired in November 1991 and was promoted to full admiral. Stefenson was the last naval officer in Sweden to be promoted to admiral in connection with retirement. Only the Supreme Commander of the Swedish Armed Forces, if he came from the navy, as well as the king, can today hold the rank of admiral.

Later career
Stefenson var chief of His Majesty's Military Staff from 1990 to 1997 and during the years 1991–1994 was he also a project leader for Projekt Krishantering ("Project Crisis Management"). He was a special investigator regarding civilian use of defense resources from 1994 to 1995.

Stefenson was elected into the Royal Swedish Society of Naval Sciences in 1968 with number 908 and was its president from 1987 to 1992. He was a member of the Royal Swedish Academy of War Sciences since 1979. He has been Inspector Emeriti of the naval academy association SjöLund. Stefenson was a politician in the Christian Democrats and a member of the Stockholm City Council (Stockholms stadsfullmäktige) and he was chairman of the Christian Democratic Senior League from 2002 to 2007. He was also an honorary member of the Christian Democratic Senior League. Stefenson was chairman of the Hovförsamlingen ("Parish of the Royal Court") for 15 years.

Personal life
In 1953, Stefenson married the parish assistant Karin Östberg (born 1932), the daughter of consul Gustaf Östberg and Margit von Stedingk.

Death

Stefenson died on 3 October 2018 in his home at Slottsbacken 2 in Stockholm. The funeral service was held on 2 November 2018 in the Royal Chapel. He was interred at Galärvarvskyrkogården in Stockholm on 9 January 2019.

Dates of rank
1951 – Acting sub-lieutenant
1953 – Sub-lieutenant
1963 – Lieutenant
1967 – Lieutenant commander
1970 – Commander
1976 – Captain
1978 – Rear admiral
1982 – Vice admiral
November 1991 – Admiral

Awards and decorations
   Knight of the Order of the Sword (6 June 1969)
  Grand Cross of the Royal Norwegian Order of Merit (1 July 1992)
   1st Class / Knight Grand Cross of the Order of Merit of the Italian Republic (8 April 1991)
   First Class of the Order of the White Star (11 September 1995)

Bibliography

References

1929 births
2018 deaths
Swedish Navy admirals
Christian Democrats (Sweden) politicians
Military personnel from Stockholm
Members of the Royal Swedish Academy of War Sciences
Members of the Royal Swedish Society of Naval Sciences
Burials at Galärvarvskyrkogården
Chiefs of the Defence Staff (Sweden)
Knights of the Order of the Sword
Knights Grand Cross of the Order of Merit of the Italian Republic
Recipients of the Order of the White Star, 1st Class